Lesticulus nocturnus is a species of predatory air-breathing land slug. It is a shell-less pulmonate gastropod mollusc in the family Trigonochlamydidae.

Lesticulus nocturnus is the only species in the genus Lesticulus.

Distribution 
The distribution of Lesticulus nocturnus includes only its type locality.

The type locality of Lesticulus nocturnus is the Oficho Cave near Kumistavi village, near Tzkhaltubo, western Georgia.

Ecology 
Lesticulus nocturnus inhabits the cave.

References

Endemic fauna of Georgia (country)
Trigonochlamydidae
Gastropods described in 1988